Ka Sol-Hyun (born 12 February 1991) is a South Korean footballer who plays as defender for Jeonnam Dragons in K League 2.

Career
He was selected by FC Anyang in 2013 K League Draft.

References

External links 

1991 births
Living people
Association football defenders
South Korean footballers
FC Anyang players
Jeonnam Dragons players
K League 1 players
K League 2 players
Korea National League players
Soju Ga clan